The Stamp Duty Land Tax (Temporary Relief) Act 2020 (c. 15) an act of the Parliament of the United Kingdom that temporarily reduces stamp duty in response to the COVID-19 pandemic in England and Northern Ireland. Separate provisions have been made in Scotland by the Scottish Parliament, and in Wales by the Welsh Assembly.

The act temporarily modifies the Finance Act 2003 to reduce the rate of Stamp Duty Land Tax during the period 8 July 2020 to 31 March 2021.

References 

United Kingdom Acts of Parliament 2020
2020 in British politics
COVID-19 pandemic in England
COVID-19 pandemic in Northern Ireland
Economic responses to the COVID-19 pandemic